Exo-SC (stylized as EXO-SC) is the second official sub-unit of South Korean–Chinese boy band Exo, consisting of Chanyeol and Sehun. Their debut EP What a Life was released on July 22, 2019.

History

2019: Formation, debut and What a Life 
During Exo's concert tour Exo Planet 4 – The Elyxion, Chanyeol and Sehun performed a song together titled "We Young" in Seoul and Macau in July and August 2018 respectively. The song was then released digitally through SM Station X 0 on September 14, 2018.

Chanyeol and Sehun debuted as Exo's second sub-unit and first duo in July. On June 28, the unit's name was announced to be Exo-SC (shortened from SeChan), after the first letter of the members' names. On the same day, it was announced that the unit will release their first extended play titled What a Life on July 22, which contains six tracks. Exo-SC received their first-ever music show win on KBS's Music Bank on August 2, eleven days after their debut.

2020: Endorsement and 1 Billion Views 

On June 12, Cass Fresh, a notable beer in South Korea, announced that Exo-SC became their brand endorser. On June 23, it was announced that the unit will release their first full album 1 Billion Views on July 13, which contains nine tracks.

With the release of their debut album they became the best selling subunit in korea for selling a combined 900,000 album sales since their debut and selling 500,000 copies with their first full length album which also hold the record of the highest sales for an album by a subunit extending their record and surpassing their own record with their debut extended play What a Life

Discography

Studio albums

Extended plays

Singles

Other charted songs

Filmography

Television shows

Music videos

Awards and nominations

Notes

References

External links 
  

Exo
K-pop music groups
Musical groups established in 2019
Musical groups from Seoul
SM Entertainment artists
SM Town
South Korean boy bands
South Korean musical duos
2019 establishments in South Korea